Western New England University is a private university in Springfield, Massachusetts. Academic programs are provided through its College of Arts and Sciences, College of Business, College of Engineering, School of Law, and College of Pharmacy and Health Sciences.

In recognition of its master's and doctoral programs, the institution officially changed its name from Western New England College to Western New England University on July 1, 2011. This marked the return of "university" to the school's name, exactly 60 years after separating from Northeastern University.  It had long been classified as a university.

History
The Springfield Division of Northeastern College, known as Springfield-Northeastern, was established in 1919. Evening classes, held in the YMCA building on Chestnut Street in Springfield for students studying part-time, were offered in law, business, and accounting. In 1922, the school's
first 13 students were awarded the degree of Bachelor of Commercial Science. The first seven law graduates were recognized in 1923.

In 1951 the Springfield Division of Northeastern University became Western New England College. The college was chartered on July 17, 1951. On April 26, 1956,  for the current Wilbraham Road campus were purchased. In that same year the first day program was started; it was in engineering, with 53 students enrolled. The first building, originally known as East Building and later renamed Emerson Hall in recognition of the college's first trustee chairman, opened in 1959.

The college's charter was expanded in 1959 to permit the college to grant the bachelor's degree in any field of business administration, science, engineering, education, and law, and certain master's degrees. The charter was expanded in 2005 to include the LL.M. in Estate Planning and Elder Law, and again in 2008 with the inclusion of the Ph.D. in Behavior Analysis.

The School of Arts and Sciences was established in 1967, and the college received accreditation as a general purpose institution in 1972.

The 1960s through the 1990s saw the college's academic programs expanding, its student body growing, and the addition of a number of buildings, including the D’Amour Library, the Blake Law Center, the St. Germain Campus Center, the Alumni Healthful Living Center, and the LaRiviere Living and Learning Center. In 2001, the Evergreen Village townhouses opened for seniors. The Kevin S. Delbridge Welcome Center, which houses the admissions offices, opened in 2002. In 2003, Commonwealth Hall and the Golden Bear Stadium opened. The George Trelease Memorial Baseball Park was completed in 2004. In 2006, the $1.9 million expansion to the D’Amour Library was completed. In 2008 and 2009, respectively, the college expanded and renovated the Blake Law Center and built Southwood Hall. In 2010, the $40 million Center for the Sciences and Pharmacy was completed. Herman Hall underwent an $8 million renovation in 2012.

The university's  campus serves as home to undergraduate, graduate, doctoral, pharmaceutical, and law students from throughout the United States and abroad. Undergraduate and graduate programs are offered in the Colleges of Arts and Sciences, Business, Engineering, Pharmacy, and at the School of Law. In 2010, the College of Pharmacy was established, and the institution was granted a change to its charter that permits it to offer the degree of Doctor of Pharmacy. Western New England University has 45,000 alumni around the world.

On July 1, 2011, Western New England College officially became Western New England University. The Massachusetts Board of Higher Education approved the name change in March 2011. The Schools of Arts and Sciences, Business, Engineering, and Pharmacy became the Colleges of Arts and Sciences, Business, Engineering, and Pharmacy. The School of Law retained its name.

Campus

Western New England University's  campus in Springfield consists of 24 major buildings and numerous athletic and recreational fields. The campus is located in a suburban neighborhood approximately four miles from downtown Springfield, near the Wilbraham border.  Much of the campus property remains undeveloped as forest and open space.  There are ten residence halls/complexes and seven buildings used for academic purposes.  A neoclassical red brick architectural style predominates among the older campus buildings, with a variety of contemporary styles incorporated in newer buildings.

As the university has grown, specialized facilities have been added within each college and school to provide additional instruction and research capacity. Recent academic expansions include a Department of Neuroscience laboratory and expanded STEM facilities, both within the College of Arts and Sciences and the College of Engineering. Churchill Hall features a stock market exchange floor simulation room for use by students in the College of Business.

The clocktower cupola atop Deliso Hall, located at the center of campus, is the university's logo and the namesake for the yearbook.

Academics
Western New England University is a comprehensive institution that grants degrees across the liberal arts and professional disciplines. The university's academic departments are organized into five academic schools with varying levels of degrees offered:

 College of Arts and Sciences: Bachelor's, master's, and doctoral.
 College of Business: Bachelor's and master's.
 College of Engineering: Bachelor's, master's, and doctoral.
 School of Law: Professional (Juris Doctor) and master's (Master of Laws).
 College of Pharmacy and Health Sciences: Professional (Doctor of Pharmacy and Doctor of Occupational Therapy)

Undergraduate students choose from nearly 50 majors as they earn a Bachelor of Arts (B.A.), Bachelor of Science (B.S.), or Bachelor of Science in Business Administration (B.S.B.A). Certificates and other non-degree programs are also offered.

Undergraduate Business and Engineering students must take certain general education classes through the College of Arts and Sciences. Students enrolled in several Arts and Sciences may choose one of several majors that can be fulfilled entirely within that school. All undergraduates may take classes across schools to achieve an integrated liberal-professional education.

Affiliations
Western New England University is accredited by the New England Commission of Higher Education. Business programs are accredited by the Association to Advance Collegiate Schools of Business, engineering programs are accredited by the Accreditation Board for Engineering and Technology, and social work programs are accredited by the Council on Social Work Education. The School of Law is accredited by the American Bar Association and is a member of the Association of American Law Schools. Teacher education programs have been approved by the Massachusetts Board of Education and are part of the Interstate Certification Compact. Western New England University is also a member of the Association of American Colleges, the National Association of Independent Colleges and Universities, and the Association of Independent Colleges and Universities of Massachusetts.

Student life
For the 2021–2022 academic year, enrollment at Western New England University was 3,674 students. Full-time undergraduate enrollment totaled 2,522 students; approximately 58 percent are male students and 42 percent female. Law enrollment was 395 students, and part-time undergraduate, graduate studies and adult learners, pharmacy, and occupational therapy enrollment totaled 731.

Clubs and organizations
There are more than 70 clubs and organizations available on campus, including honors societies, professional and departmental cubs, media and publications organizations, special interest groups, the Student Senate, residence hall associations, and campus ministry groups. Honors societies at the college include: Alpha Kappa Delta, Alpha Lambda Delta, Alpha Phi Sigma, Beta Alpha Psi, Beta Gamma Sigma, Lambda Pi Eta, Mortar Board, Omicron Delta Kappa, Phi Alpha Theta, Pi Sigma Alpha, Psi Chi, Tau Beta Pi. The Cupola is the yearbook, The Review of Art & Literature is the literary magazine, GB-TV "Golden Bear Television" is the TV station, The Westerner is the newspaper, and WNEK-FM 105.1 FM is the radio station.

A popular organization that is prominent on campus is the Peer Advising program. The program consists of sophomore, junior, and senior students that have undergone a variety of interviews and rigorous training in the areas of campus knowledge along with student development. When the new class of students arrive on campus, they are assigned a Peer Advisor, who serves as a student mentor throughout their first year on campus. The Peer Advisor works with the student in a variety of areas such as personal development, goal setting, academics, personal concerns, and transitional issues.

Athletics

Western New England University is a member of the National Collegiate Athletic Association Division III. Sports include: baseball, basketball, cross country running, field hockey, football, golf, ice hockey, lacrosse, soccer, softball, swimming, tennis, volleyball, and wrestling. Most sports are part of the Commonwealth Coast Conference (CCC), while football is part of the CCC's quasi-independent football-only arm, Commonwealth Coast Football, women's swimming & diving compete in the Little East Conference; and wrestling is part of the New England College Conference Wrestling Association. Non-NCAA varsity sports include martial arts and bowling. Prior to 2008, the college competed in the Great Northeast Athletic Conference (GNAC) for baseball, men's and women's basketball, men's and women's cross country, men's and women's soccer, softball, women's swimming, men's and women's tennis, and women's volleyball; in the North Atlantic Conference (NAC) for field hockey, and the New England Women's Lacrosse Alliance (NEWLA) for women's lacrosse. The mascot is the Golden Bear. Athletics facilities the college include the Alumni Healthful Living Center, Golden Bear Stadium, George E. Trelease Memorial Baseball Park, Suprenant Field, Golden Bear Softball Park, and the tennis courts.

The Golden Bear Pep Band is an instrumental group founded in 1998 by undergraduate students. Consisting of various brass and woodwind instruments accompanied by drums, the band plays at University sporting events.

In 2017 students created Western New England University's Drumline to perform at football games and open houses, alongside the Golden Bear Pep Band.

Residence life
The university has 10 residence facilities on campus: Berkshire Hall, Commonwealth Hall, Evergreen Village Townhouses, Franklin Hall, Gateway Village Apartments, Hampden Hall, LaRiviere Residential Living and Learning Center, Plymouth Complex, Windham HallSouthwood Hall Apartments. At the end of the 2017–2018 school year, Plymouth Complex was closed.

Traditions

The Golden Bear
Since 1951, the Golden Bear has been the mascot for Western New England University. A five-ton, nine-foot replica of an Alaskan Kodiak Island Brown Bear was installed next to the Campus Center on November 7, 1986. Former Professor of Management and founder and former Head Coach of the football team Henry Bazan spearheaded an effort starting in 1976 called "Bring the Bear Home Committee" to bring the statue to campus. Bazan affectionately nicknamed the Golden Bear "Spirit."

The Rock
At 4:30 a.m. on May 16, 1968, 16 seniors lifted a 10-ton rock from a construction site at what would later become the Five Town Plaza and brought it to campus, placing it between Herman Hall and the Campus Center. "Class of 1968" was painted on The Rock, as it came to be known. This initial painting became a tradition that is upheld to this day. Each year, The Rock is painted numerous times to advertise different student clubs, activities, and events.

Alma mater
The alma mater is called "Theme Song for Western New England University." It was written by Eugene Weaver, a 1954 alumnus, shortly after the founding of the college in 1951.

Notable persons

Alumni
Western New England University has 43,000 alumni who live and work around the world. The Western New England University School of Law has more than 7,000 alumni, while the MBA and MSA programs have nearly 6,000 alumni. The general University alumni magazine used to be called The Communicator. The School of Law alumni magazine is called Perspectives. A new magazine launched in 2019 called WNE: The Magazine of Western New England University.

Notable alumni
 John Joseph Bell, Air Force officer and member of the Virginia House of Delegates
 Nicholas Boldyga - member of the Massachusetts House of Representatives (served 2011–present)
 Thomas G. Bowman JD - American political aide and retired Marine Corps Colonel who served as the United States Deputy Secretary of Veterans Affairs from August 10, 2017, to June 15, 2018
 Stephen Buoniconti JD'95 - former member of the Massachusetts Senate (served 2005–2011) and former member of the Massachusetts House of Representatives (served 2001 - 2004).
 Lawrence F. Cafero JD'81 - member of Connecticut House of Representatives and Republican House Leader.
 Gale D. Candaras  JD'82 - member of the Massachusetts Senate (served 2007–present) and former member of the Massachusetts House of Representatives (served 1996 - 2006).
 Michael A. Christ JD'02 - former Deputy Majority Leader of Connecticut House of Representatives.
 Cheryl A. Coakley-Rivera JD'95, member of the Massachusetts House of Representatives (served 1999–present).
 Michael Charles Green JD'86 - District Attorney for Monroe County, New York
 Curt Hawkins - WWE Wrestler (Did not graduate)
 Anthony Katagas - Academy Award-winning producer of 12 Years A Slave.
 Daniel F. Keenan JD - former member of the Massachusetts House of Representatives (served 1995–2007)
 John Kissel JD'84 - member of the Connecticut State Senate.
 Michael Mori JD'94 - U.S. Marine Corps lawyer.
 Thomas S. Moorman Jr. MBA'72 - served as Vice Chief of Staff of the United States Air Force.
 Tim Murray JD'94 - former Lieutenant Governor of Massachusetts and former Mayor of Worcester, Massachusetts.
 Larry O'Brien '42 - Chairman of the Democratic National Committee during the Watergate break-in, former National Basketball Association Commissioner, and former U.S. Postmaster General (then a Cabinet position). O'Brien was campaign manager for John F. Kennedy, Robert F. Kennedy, Lyndon B. Johnson, Hubert Humphrey, George McGovern, and Foster Furcolo.  Namesake of the Smithsonian Institution's O'Brien Gallery in Washington, DC and the Lawrence O'Brien Award.
 Thomas Petrolati - member of the Massachusetts House of Representatives (served 1987–present)
 Angelo Puppolo JD'01 - member of the Massachusetts House of Representatives (served 2007–present) and former City Councilor in the city of Springfield, Massachusetts
 Joseph Rallo JD'76 - president of Angelo State University.
Regina Rush-Kittle MS'97 - past deputy commissioner, Connecticut State Division of Emergency Management and Homeland Security
 Rodney Smith - bronze medal winner in the 68-kg division of the Greco-Roman wrestling competition at the 1992 Olympic Games and also competed in the 1996 Olympic Games
 Thomas L. Stevenson JD'77 - former member of the Pennsylvania House of Representatives (served 1997–2006)
 John E. Sweeney JD'91 - former member of the U.S. House of Representatives from upstate New York and noted conservative legislator
 Tommy Tallarico - video game music composer and musician
 Joseph Wagner - member of the Massachusetts House of Representatives (served 1991–present)

Notable faculty and staff
 Pearl Abraham - assistant professor of English and an American novelist, essayist, and short story writer who has written four novels: The Romance Reader, Giving Up America, The Seventh Beggar, and American Taliban
 Anthony S. Caprio - president emeritus of Western New England University and a French language scholar
 Charles Clason - former dean of the School of Law, former member of the House of Representatives from Massachusetts from 1937 to 1949, and namesake of the School of Law's Clason Speaker Series
 Julie Croteau - former baseball assistant coach after she was the first woman to play men's NCAA baseball at St. Mary's College of Maryland
 Stephen Danbusky - former men's soccer assistant coach and former professional soccer player
 Jean Marie Higiro - associate professor of communication and former director of the Rwandan Information Office (ORINFOR), a government corporation that run Radio Rwanda, Rwandan Television and state controlled media in the Republic of Rwanda
 Tom Hull - associate professor of mathematics and expert in the mathematics of paper folding
 Chris Iijima - former professor and Asian American folksinger, educator and legal scholar
Linda Jones - professor of materials science and engineering
 Barbara Lenk - trustee and associate justice of the Massachusetts Supreme Judicial Court
 Joan Mahoney - former dean of the School of Law and former dean of Wayne State University Law School
 Michael Meeropol - former economics professor, eldest son of Ethel and Julius Rosenberg, and the author of SURRENDER: How the Clinton Administration Completed the Reagan Revolution
 Robert Meeropol former anthropology professor from 1971 to 1973 and son of Ethel and Julius Rosenberg
 Richard Muhlberger - former professor of art history, former vice-director of New York's Metropolitan Museum of Art, and an American art critic.  Also author of numerous art titles including:  What makes a Rembrandt a Rembrandt?, What makes a Raphael a Raphael?, What makes a Bruegel a Bruegel?, What makes a Degas a Degas?, Bible in Art: The Old Testament, Bible in Art: The New Testament, and Charles Webster Hawthorne: Paintings and Watercolors.
 Anibál Nieves - former head wrestling coach and wrestler representing Puerto Rico in the 1992 and 1996 Olympics and two-time silver medalist at the Pan American Games

Notes

References

External links
Official website
Official athletics website

 
Universities and colleges in Springfield, Massachusetts
Educational institutions established in 1919
1919 establishments in Massachusetts
Private universities and colleges in Massachusetts